Chalybeate Springs (  is an unincorporated community in Lawrence County, Alabama, United States.

History
The community is named after the chalybeate springs found in the area. The community was formerly home to a hotel, where visitors would stay while using the springs.

References

Unincorporated communities in Lawrence County, Alabama
Unincorporated communities in Alabama